The Council of Common Interests (CCI) is a constitutional body in the Government of Pakistan. It is appointed by the President on the advice of the Prime Minister. The CCI resolves the disputes of power sharing between the federation and its provinces. The Council works under Ministry of Inter Provincial Coordination and it responsible to both houses of Parliament, the Senate of Pakistan and the National Assembly of Pakistan.

History 
The Council of Common Interests was formed under the 1973 Constitution of Pakistan. Until 2010 the body worked under Cabinet Division. After the passing of the 18th amendment the body was transferred to the Ministry of Inter Provincial Coordination on 4 March 2010.

Membership 
Membership of the current CCI consists of following:

Membership of the Council of Common Interests consists of following:

 The Prime Minister of Pakistan (Chairman of the Council) 
 All four Provincial Chief Ministers
 Three members to be nominated by Prime Minister (Usually Cabinet members)

After passage of the Eighteenth Constitutional Amendment in April 2010 by Asif ali zardari, it is mandatory for the Council to meet once in ninety days.

See also 
 Ministry of Inter Provincial Coordination
Eighteenth Amendment to the Constitution of Pakistan
Federalism in Pakistan

References

Constitution of Pakistan
Federalism in Pakistan